Emilia Dimitrova (born 27 December 1970) is a Bulgarian badminton player. She competed in women's doubles at the 1992 Summer Olympics in Barcelona.

References

External links

1970 births
Living people
Bulgarian female badminton players
Olympic badminton players of Bulgaria
Badminton players at the 1992 Summer Olympics